Native Zakarpattia is a political party in Zakarpattia Oblast, western Ukraine. Founded in 2018, its leader is Andriy Novytskyi. It holds a plurality of 12 seats on the Zakarpattia Oblast Council won in the 2020 Ukrainian local elections, making it the largest regional party in Zakarpattia. The party was developed by four Ukrainian MP's from the Dovira faction. These four MP's being Vasyl Petiovka, Valerii Lunchenko, Robert Khorvat and Vladislav Poliak.

On 25 November 2021  of Native Zakarpattia was elected  chairman of the Zakarpattia Oblast Council.

References

2018 establishments in Ukraine
Political parties established in 2018
Political parties in Ukraine
Regionalist parties in Ukraine
Zakarpattia Oblast